Estadio Oscar Ramos Cabieses is a municipal stadium in Lima, Peru opened in 1970. The stadium holds 5,000 people. In the 1970s it was used by Walter Ormeño as its home venue. The stadium is owned by the Municipalidad of Imperial.

References

Oscar Ramos Cabieses
Sports venues in Lima
Multi-purpose stadiums in Peru
Sports venues completed in 1970
1970 establishments in Peru